The Ministry of Culture is a government ministry of Lebanon.

History
The Ministry was formed in 1993, originally as part of the Ministry of Culture and Higher Education from which it became a separate entity in August 2000. A new law was passed in October 2008 regarding a re-structuring for the Ministry. It now has responsibility over matters of heritage, antiquities, arts, literature, cultural industries and management of cultural and historical property.

Tasks and responsibilities
The ministry's remit includes various tasks such as planning cultural and sectoral policy, organising and sponsoring literary and artistic affairs, developing the knowledge economy and establishing and co-ordinating expertise. Responsibilities include proposing draft laws and regulations, promoting creativity, research and productivity, promoting innovative products, establishing cultural facilities, archaeological surveys and excavations, preservation and public display of antiques and managing ancient sites. The ministry also supports and facilitates research in cultural fields organizes cultural events and conferences.

Structure
The Ministry is divided into three units, The Directorate General of Cultural Affairs, The Directorate General of Antiquities and The Joint Administrative Service. It also runs The Baakleen National Library, the General Authority for Museums and the National Higher Institute of Music. It is also attached to the National Committee for Education, Knowledge and Culture.

Former ministers
 Michel Edde (1993–1996)
 Fawzi Hobeiche (1996–1998)
 Muhammad Baydoun (1998–2000)
 Ghassan Salamé (2000–2003)
 Ghazi Aridi (2003–2004)
 Naji Al-Boustani (2004–2005)
 Karam Karam (2005)
 Assaad Rizk (2005)
 Tarek Mitri (2005–2008)
 Tammam Salam (2008–2009)
 Salim Wardeh (2009–2011)
 Gaby Layyoun (2011–2014)
 Rony Araygi (2014–2016)
 Ghattas Khoury (2016–2019)
 Mohammad Daoud (2019–2020)
 Abbas Mortada (2020–present)
 Mohammad Wissam El-Mortada (2021-present)

See also
Archaeology in Lebanon

References

1993 establishments in Lebanon
Ministries established in 1993
Government ministries of Lebanon
Culture ministries